Lim Eun-ji (Korean: 임은지; born 2 April 1989) is a South Korean pole vaulter. She is the current South Korean national record holder in the event indoors and a former outdoor record holder.

Having previously competed in the 100 metres hurdles, triple jump, and heptathlon, Lim competed in the pole vault for the first time in December 2007. She quickly improved over a period of ten months, breaking the national junior record in Gwangju with a vault of 4.10 metres in October 2008. She soon began challenging the senior records, taking the indoor national record with a jump of 4.24 m in March 2009.

At the Corporate Teams' National Competitions on 28 April 2009, Lim broke Choi Yun-Hee's outdoor record of 4.16 m by some distance, vaulting a height of 4.35 m. This record also made her eligible to compete at the 2009 World Championships in Berlin. She finished bottom of her group with a best clearance of 4.10 m at the 2009 World Championships, but she went on to win the gold medal at the 2009 East Asian Games later that year.

She failed a drug test in Korea in July 2010, testing positive for the diuretics hydrochlorothiazide and chlorothiazide. She received a three-month ban for the infraction.

Personal bests

All information taken from IAAF Profile.

See also
List of doping cases in athletics

References

External links

1989 births
Living people
South Korean female pole vaulters
Athletes (track and field) at the 2014 Asian Games
Athletes (track and field) at the 2018 Asian Games
Asian Games medalists in athletics (track and field)
Asian Games bronze medalists for South Korea
Medalists at the 2014 Asian Games
Medalists at the 2018 Asian Games
Sportspeople from Seoul